Pyroxenite is an ultramafic igneous rock consisting essentially of minerals of the pyroxene group, such as augite, diopside, hypersthene, bronzite or enstatite. Pyroxenites are classified into clinopyroxenites, orthopyroxenites, and the websterites which contain both types of pyroxenes (see diagram below). Closely allied to this group are the hornblendites, consisting essentially of hornblende and other amphiboles.

They are essentially of igneous origin, though some pyroxenites are included in the metamorphic Lewisian complex of Scotland. The pyroxene-rich rocks, which result from the type of contact metamorphism known as pyroxene-hornfels facies, have siliceous sediment or basaltic protoliths, and are respectively metapelites and metabasites.

Intrusive and mantle pyroxenites

Igneous pyroxenites are closely allied to gabbros and norites, from which they differ by the absence of feldspar, and to peridotites, which are distinguished from them by containing more than 40% olivine. This connection is indicated also by their mode of occurrence, for they usually accompany masses of gabbro and peridotite and seldom are found by themselves.

They are often very coarse-grained, containing individual crystals which may be several inches in length. The principal accessory minerals, in addition to olivine and feldspar, are chromite and other spinels, garnet, magnetite, rutile, and scapolite.

Pyroxenites can be formed as cumulates in ultramafic intrusions by accumulation of pyroxene crystals at the base of the magma chamber. Here they are generally associated with gabbro and anorthite cumulate layers and are typically high up in the intrusion. They may be accompanied by magnetite layers, ilmenite layers, but rarely chromite cumulates.

Pyroxenites are also found as layers within masses of peridotite. These layers most commonly have been interpreted as products of reaction between ascending magmas and peridotite of the upper mantle. The layers typically are a few centimeters to a meter or so in thickness. Pyroxenites that occur as xenoliths in basalt and in kimberlite have been interpreted as fragments of such layers. Although some mantle pyroxenites contain garnet, they are not eclogites, as clinopyroxene in them is less sodic than omphacite and the pyroxenite compositions typically are unlike that of basalt. Pyroxenites might play an important role in basalt genesis (e.g., Lambart et al., 2016), either by contributing directly to the magma production, or indirectly as the result of reaction between peridotite and magma derived from partial melting of eclogite (e.g., Sobolev and others, 2007).

Pyroxenite lavas
Purely pyroxene-bearing volcanic rocks are rare, restricted to spinifex-textured sills, lava tubes and thick flows in the Archaean greenstone belts. Here, the pyroxenite lavas are created by in-situ crystallisation and accumulation of pyroxene at the base of a lava flow, creating the distinctive spinifex texture, but also occasionally mesocumulate and orthocumulate segregations. This is in essence similar to the formation of olivine spinifex textures in komatiite lava flows, the chemistry of the magma differing only to favor crystallisation of  pyroxene.

A type locality is the Gullewa Greenstone Belt, in the Murchison region of Western Australia, and the Duketon Belt near Laverton, where pyroxene spinifex lavas are closely associated with gold deposits.

Distribution
They frequently occur in the form of dikes or segregations in gabbro and peridotite: in Shetland, Cortland on the Hudson River, North Carolina (websterite), Baltimore, New Zealand, and in Saxony. They are also found in the Bushveld Igneous Complex in South Africa and The Great Dyke in Zimbabwe.

The pyroxenites are often subject serpentinization under low temperature retrograde metamorphism and weathering. The rocks are often completely replaced by serpentines, which sometimes preserve the original structures of the primary minerals, such as the lamination of hypersthene and the rectangular cleavage of augite. Under pressure-metamorphism hornblende is developed and various types of amphibolite and hornblende-schist are produced. Occasionally rocks rich in pyroxene are found as basic facies of nepheline syenite; a good example is provided by the melanite pyroxenites associated with the borolanite variety found in the Loch Borralan igneous complex of Scotland.

References

Lambart, S. L., and others, 2016, The role of pyroxenite in basalt genesis: Melt-PX, a melting parameterization for mantle pyroxenites between 0.9 and 5 GPa, Journal of Geophysical Research - Solid Earth 121, p. 5708–5735
Sobolev, A. V., and others, 2007, The amount of recycled crust in sources of mantle-derived melts, Science 316, p. 412-417 (abstract) Retrieved on 6 October 2007

External links

Ultramafic rocks
Plutonic rocks
Volcanic rocks